SKOGA was an airline jointly controlled by China and the Soviet Union, based in Beijing, China, which operated from 1950 to 1954. The name SKOGA is the acronym of Sovyetsko-Kitaiskoe Obschestvo Grazhdanskoi Aviatsii (Soviet-Chinese Civil Aviation Company in Russian: Советско-Китайское общество гражданской авиации). The Chinese name was 中蘇民用航空股份公司 (simplified: 中苏民用航空股份公司; pinyin: zhōngsū mínháng gōngsī), translating to Sino-Soviet Civil Aviation Joint-Stock Company in English.

History
On 2 November 1949, the Chinese and Soviet governments signed an agreement to establish a Sino-Soviet civil aviation joint-stock company, owned in equal share by each party. With a starting capital of 42 million Soviet rubles, the Chinese side provided airports, buildings, warehouses, and maintenance facilities. The Soviets contributed aircraft, communication equipment, transportation means, maintenance facilities and airports on Soviet territory. Management offices were set up in Beijing, Shenyang and Ürümqi.

SKOGA was formally established on 1 July 1950, immediately commencing services from Beijing to Chita via Shenyang, Harbin and Hailar, utilising Russian Lisunov Li-2 aircraft. This route was initially served once a week, the frequency later being increased to three services weekly, departing Beijing on Mondays, Wednesdays and Fridays, and returning from Chita on Tuesdays, Thursdays and Saturdays. Routes to Irkutsk and Almaty (in present-day Kazakhstan) were also added. From May 1952, Ilyushin Il-12 aircraft were operated.

On 12 October 1954, the Chinese and Soviet governments announced that from 1 January 1955, SKOGA would come completely under Chinese control. From this time, SKOGA ceased operations, and was superseded by the Civil Aviation Administration of China (CAAC) to handle Chinese air traffic.

Destinations
According to a SKOGA timetable from 1954, the following destinations were served:

China
 Aksu
 Beijing
 Hailar
 Hami
 Harbin
 Jiuquan
 Kashgar
 Kuqa
 Lanzhou
 Qiqihar
 Shenyang
 Taiyuan
 Ürümqi
 Xi'an
 Yining
 
Mongolia
 Sainshand
 Ulaanbataar

Soviet Union
 Almaty  
 Chita
 Irkutsk

References

External links
 
 
  (Illustrated story of airline)
  (Images of crewmember badges)

Defunct airlines of China
Airlines established in 1950
Airlines disestablished in 1954
Airlines of China
1950 establishments in China
1954 disestablishments in China
Former Aeroflot divisions
Civil Aviation Administration of China